Tuomas Veikko Saikku (22 December 1906 - 19 September 1963) was a Finnish agronomist, farmer and politician, born in Sääksmäki. He was a member of the Parliament of Finland from 1956 to 1958, representing the National Coalition Party.

References

1906 births
1963 deaths
People from Valkeakoski
People from Häme Province (Grand Duchy of Finland)
National Coalition Party politicians
Members of the Parliament of Finland (1954–58)